Team Vitality is a French esports organisation founded in August 2013 by Fabien Devide and Nicolas Maurer. It has several professional teams and content creators from across Europe and India.

Team Vitality's main League of Legends team competes in the LEC (formerly EU LCS), which they joined in late 2015 after purchasing Gambit Gaming's spot.

League of Legends

History 
Team Vitality entered the professional League of Legends on 9 December 2015, after it acquired Gambit Gaming's spot in the 2016 EU LCS Spring Split. The first player signed to the team at the time of the announcement was former TSM support Raymond "kaSing" Tsang. Five days later, Vitality announced the rest of their roster, which consisted of top laner Lucas "Cabochard " Simon-Meslet, jungler Ilyas "Shook" Hartsema, mid laner Erlend "Nukeduck" Våtevik Holm, and kaSing's former teammate, bot laner Petter "Hjarnan" Freyschuss. For their coaching staff, Vitality signed former Gambit Gaming coach Shaunz.

2016 
During the 2016 EU LCS Spring Split, Vitality's roster was considered one of the top lineups in the league, finishing in third place with a 13–5 record, behind the surprise first place G2 Esports and second place H2k-Gaming. Cabochard and kaSing were elected to the split's All Pro Team, as the most outstanding players in their positions. In playoffs, however, they were upset by sixth place Fnatic and eliminated in the quarterfinals.

Before the start of the 2016 EU LCS Summer Split, Shook and Hjarnan left the team, the latter due to health reasons. Vitality then signed Kim "Mightybear" Min-soo, the former jungler of Newbee, and acquired bot laner Park "Police" Hyeong-gi from Apex Gaming.

With the new match format, Vitality failed to live up to prior standards, accruing only three match wins throughout the summer regular season with a 3–9–6 series record. Shook returned four weeks into the season and became the starting jungler once again. After winning a tiebreaker against FC Schalke 04, Vitality secured seventh place and avoided playing in the relegation series, although they also missed playoffs.

2017 
Prior to the start of the competitive season, Vitality again revamped its roster. Bot laner Pierre "Steeelback" Medjaldi was acquired from Team ROCCAT to replace Police, and Ha "Hachani" Seung-chan, a former support for KT Rolster, was signed to replace kaSing. In the jungle, Vitality initially looked toward Afreeca Freecs jungler LirA, but the deal unexpectedly fell through, as LirA reportedly felt uncomfortable with the move. Vitality instead ended up signing Lee "GBM" Chang-seok as a substitute mid laner, as well as jungler Charly "Djoko" Guillard of the EU CS team Millenium. Top laner Adrien "Alderiate" Wils and support Baltat "AoD" Alin-Ciprian were also signed with the team as substitutes.

With the reorganization of the EU LCS regular season format, Vitality was drafted into Group B for the 2017 EU LCS Spring Split, along with Origen, H2k, Splyce, and the Unicorns of Love. After opening the season with a 1–3 record over three weeks, Hachani was benched. Three days later, GBM moved to the starting mid laner position, while Nukeduck took over the vacant support position. Because of a continuous lack of success, Vitality kept reshuffling their roster around without significant improvement and ended far out of reach of playoff positions in fourth place of the group, only beating Origen twice and the last place team of Group A, Giants Gaming.

For the 2017 EU LCS Summer Split, Vitality signed support Oskar "Vander" Bogdan and got picked into a nearly identical Group B with the recently promoted Mysterious Monkeys instead of Origen. Despite mild improvements thanks to the roster change, Vitality once again finished fourth in their group.

2018 
Vitality completely rebuilt their roster around top laner Cabochard going into 2018 and signed veteran jungler Erberk "Gilius" Demir, along with rookies mid laner Daniele "Jiizuke" di Mauro, bot laner Amadeu "Minitroupax" Carvalho, and support Jakub "Jactroll" Skurzyński, who together had won the 2018 Spring Promotion tournament while they were with Giants Gaming. The new roster surprised many with a 7–1 start to the spring regular season with their explosive playstyle; however, as other teams adapted to their strategies, Vitality began dropping games and finished fourth with a 10–8 record. Vitality ended fourth in playoffs as well after defeating H2k 3–2 in the quarterfinals and losing to Fnatic 1–3 in the semifinals and Splyce 2–3 in the third place decider match.

Following a mediocre 5–5 first half of the 2018 EU LCS Summer Split, Vitality signed veteran jungler Mateusz "Kikis" Szkudlarek after week five, hoping that he could improve the roster with his experience. Vitality finished the regular season in second place after winning two tiebreaker games against FC Schalke 04 and G2 Esports. Because of this improvement due to the roster change, Gilius decided to step away from the team as they were performing better with Kikis. In the semifinals Vitality lost against FC Schalke 04, but later managed to defeat Misfits 3–1 in the third place decider match—the latter result earned Vitality the second most championship points, qualifying them for the 2018 World Championship as Europe's second seed.

At the 2018 World Championship, Vitality were drawn into Group B along with LCK third seed Gen.G, NA LCS third seed Cloud9 and LPL favourites Royal Never Give Up (RNG). After going 1–2 in the first week, Vitality upset RNG in the second, but still ended third in their group with a 3–3 record, ending their worlds run.

On 20 November 2018, Riot Games announced Team Vitality as one of ten franchise teams of the newly rebranded League of Legends European Championship (LEC).

2019 
For the 2019 LEC Spring Split, Vitality acquired jungler Lee "Mowgli" Jae-ha from LCK team Afreeca Freecs. The team finished the regular season in fifth place with a 10–8 record and later lost 0–3 to Fnatic in the quarterfinals. Vitality did not make any roster changes going into the 2019 LEC Summer Split and barely clenched a playoff spot after defeating SK Gaming in a sixth place tiebreaker match. In the first round of playoffs Vitality was knocked out by FC Schalke 04, who defeated them 3–1.

Current roster

Rainbow Six: Siege

History 
Team Vitality first acquired a Rainbow Six: Siege roster on Xbox One for the Xbox One Pro League in December 2015, shortly after the game was released. Vitality competed in all three seasons of the Xbox One Pro League and took first in Season Three. Vitality also placed second in the first and only Xbox One Six Invitational in February 2016. Following this, the Xbox One Pro League shut down and Vitality picked up a PC roster which consisted of Bryan "Elemzje" Tebessi, Julian "Enemy" Blin, Dimitri "Panix" de Longeaux, Jean "RevaN" Prudenti, Valentin "Risze" Liradelfo, and Sami "Stooflex" Smail as coach. Shortly after, the Vitality Rainbow Six: Siege Xbox One team transferred to PC as Vitality. Black with Quentin "Tactiss" Rousselle replacing Arnaud "BiOs" Billaudel a few months later. The original PC team then became known as Vitality.White. Stooflex and Elemzje left Vitality.White later that year in June with Jean-Baptiste "Hansen" Mace replacing Elemzje along with Laurie "Lyloun" Lagier and Julien "Kivvi" Serrier joining as coaches in September 2016. Vitality.Black then disbanded later in September, allowing Lyloun to join the main team. In February 2018, Valentin "Voy" Cheron replaced Hansen, only weeks before the Six Invitational 2018, the Rainbow Six: Siege world championship, where they placed 13th–16th, the lowest possible placement in the tournament.

On 12 March 2018, Vitality dropped their current roster after disappointing results at the Six Invitational 2018 and acquired the roster of French team Supremacy. This new roster performed better than the former, placing third in European Pro League Season 7, second in the Coupe de France 2018, and second at Dreamhack Valencia 2018, qualifying for the Six Major Paris 2018. Shortly before Dreamhack Valencia, BiOs returned to Vitality as a coach. At the Six Major Paris 2018, Vitality placed 5th–8th, after defeating both Team Liquid and PET Nora-Rengo, but being eliminated by Team Secret, the same team they were defeated by at Dreamhack Valencia. While performing well at offline events, Vitality struggle online and placed seventh in European Pro League Season 8, and lost the relegation match to ENCE. After being relegated to the Challenger League, Adrien "RaFaLe" Rutik and Florian "ZephiR" Perrot along with coach BiOs left to return to Supremacy. Morgan "rxwd" Pacy and David "sNKy" Khalfa would replace them while Lyloun would become the primary coach.

After performing well in European Challenger League Season 9 during early 2019, Vitality played against long-time rivals Team Secret after losing to MnM Gaming (now Natus Vincere in a match which determines who goes straight to European Pro League Season 10. Vitality defeated Secret 2–1 and qualified for European Pro League Season 10. Vitality competed in the Allied Esports Vegas Minor in which they placed 9th–11th after defeating PENTA and Team oNe, but falling to European team Chaos Esports Club and top North American teams Spacestation Gaming and Rise Nation. At Dreamhack Valencia 2019, Vitality defeated Korean team Cloud9 twice and lost to FaZe Clan in the group stage, and were eliminated in the quarterfinals by Chaos. During the halfway point of European Pro League Season 10, Vitality placed third by defeating top European teams such as Natus Vincere and Chaos. Additionally, Vitality defeated world champions G2 Esports 7–5 and lost only to Team Empire and Giants Gaming, who were placed first and second at the time respectively. During the European Six Major Raleigh qualifier, Vitality were favorites to win alongside Chaos. Vitality placed first after defeating teams such as PENTA Sports and BDS Esports, but being disqualified due to disconnecting from the match against ForZe Esports, who went on to win the qualifier and place 3–4th in the event. In the second half of the season, Vitality was still in the running for the Pro League Season 10 Finals, but were effectively eliminated due to losses against G2 and Empire, even though the team later beat Giants without losing a round. They placed 5th, just behind Empire and G2, but ahead of Chaos, PENTA, and GiFu Esports. Vitality placed second in the 6 French League 2019, after tying 3 times and only losing twice, against first place Giants Gaming.

After season 10 of Pro League, Spark and Quaal were benched and replaced by two time world champion of Daniel "Goga" Mazorra Romero of G2 along with Lucas "Hungry" Reich of PENTA.

Team Vitality announced on 16 March 2021 that they were benching Fabian and Goga, two of the most decorated Rainbow Six players of all time, and the immediate release of Hungry. They were replaced by Kaktus, P4 and Shiinka respectively. Team Vitality also hired ex-Rogue manager Robz. On 16 June 2021, Team Vitality released Fabian from the roster who immediately joined an organisation-less team along with his former teammate, Pengu.

Current roster

Rocket League

History 
Vitality ventured into the professional Rocket League scene after it acquired the roster of Guess Who on 12 February 2018. The team was renamed Renault Vitality, after titular sponsor Renault.

Renault Vitality defeated G2 Esports on 23 June 2019 to win Season 7 of the Rocket League Championship Series. Kyle "Scrub Killa" Robertson was named Worlds MVP.

On 15 December, during the RLCS Season 8 Finals in Madrid, Renault Vitality was able to reach the final match again. This time they lost to NRG Esports in seven games.

On 15 January 2020, Vitality announced that they had released Scrub Killa.

At the same time, the new third player, Alpha54 was announced.

On 20 June 2021, Vitality won the European RLCS X Championship against Team BDS.

Vitality signed Victor "Ferra" Francal on 30 March 2022 as their head coach, replacing Mout.

Following the RLCS 2021–2022 Winter Major, Radosin from Williams Resolve was added to the starting roster and Fairy Peak! was moved to the substitute position.

After the RLCS 2021/2022 season, Kaydop and Fairy Peak were replaced by saizen and zen.

During the RLCS 2022–2023 Winter Regional, Vitality qualified as the 4th seed for the Winter Major which is to be held in San Diego for the first time since the 2021–2022 season.

Current roster

Call of Duty: Mobile

History 
Team Vitality announced on 26 March 2021 that it had signed an all-Indian Call of Duty: Mobile team.

Counter-Strike: Global Offensive

History 
ZywOo is recognized as the best player of BLAST Premier Spring Groups 2023 according to the organizers.

Current roster

Valorant

Current roster

FIFA
In December 2022, Team Vitality partnered with French association football club LOSC Lille to create a FIFA eLigue 1 team.

References

External links 
 

 
2013 establishments in France
Esports teams based in France
Esports teams established in 2013
League of Legends European Championship teams
FIFA (video game series) teams
Fighting game player sponsors
Hearthstone teams
PlayerUnknown's Battlegrounds teams
Rocket League teams
Tom Clancy's Rainbow Six Siege teams
Defunct and inactive Call of Duty teams
Defunct and inactive Halo (franchise) teams